Amund Grøndahl Jansen (born 11 February 1994) is a Norwegian cyclist, who currently rides for UCI WorldTeam . He won the Norwegian National Road Race Championships in 2019.

Career
In July 2018, he was named in the start list for the 2018 Tour de France.

In June 2019, Grøndahl Jansen won his first professional stage win at Stage 3 of the 2019 ZLM Tour, attacking from a reduced group with one kilometre from the finish. Later that month, he became Norwegian road champion, winning in a sprint of three riders.

Major results

2011
 1st Stage 4 Internationale Niedersachsen-Rundfahrt
2012
 2nd Time trial, National Junior Road Championships
 UEC European Junior Road Championships
4th Time trial
10th Road race
2014
 1st  Mountains classification Tour of Norway
 5th Time trial, National Road Championships
2015
 10th Road race, National Under–23 Road Championships
2016
 1st  Road race, National Under–23 Road Championships
 1st  Overall ZLM Roompot Tour
1st Stage 1 (TTT)
 1st  Overall Tour de Gironde
1st  Mountains classification
1st  Young rider classification
1st Stage 2
 1st Stage 2 Tour de l'Avenir
 4th Ronde van Vlaanderen
 5th Road race, UCI Road World Under–23 Championships
 7th Grand Prix d'Isbergues
2017
 2nd Druivenkoers Overijse
 4th Schaal Sels
 5th Binche–Chimay–Binche
 8th Primus Classic
 10th Tour de l'Eurométropole
2018
 2nd Gooikse Pijl
 7th Overall Tour des Fjords
2019
 1st  Road race, National Road Championships
 1st Stage 2 (TTT) Tour de France
 2nd Overall ZLM Tour
1st Stage 3
 2nd Overall Four Days of Dunkirk
 5th Bretagne Classic
 5th London–Surrey Classic
 8th Overall Arctic Race of Norway
10th Overall Tour of Britain

Grand Tour general classification results timeline

References

External links

1994 births
Living people
Norwegian male cyclists
People from Nes, Akershus
Sportspeople from Viken (county)